Murat Saygıner (born February 28, 1989) is a Turkish self-taught photographer and digital artist, and is also known as a filmmaker and composer.

Early life 
Born in Prague in 1989, Murat Saygıner got involved with photography and digital art in 2007 and won several international awards. In 2008 his works were selected for "IPA Best of Show" exhibition in New York. In 2010 he was awarded Emerging Talent of the Year in "The Photography Gala Awards".

He has written, directed and produced several animated short films since 2013 which were screened in over 200 film festivals including Academy Award Qualifying Festivals such as "Animest" and Athens International Film and Video Festival. 6 of his films were also Staff Picked on Vimeo. In 2019 he assembled 10 of his short films under the title of The Flying Fish which had various reviews by film critics.

Besides his career in visual arts, Saygıner also composes music.

He is currently living and working as a freelancer in Ankara, Turkey.

Awards 

2018 Mexico International Film Festival, Mexico
Winner of the Golden Palm award in Animation Competition
2017 Open World Animation Festival, USA
Winner of the award for Best Experimental Film
2017 ATF Animated Film Festival, Iran
Appreciated Film in Experimental and Newmedia Section
2016 5th Hak-İş International Short Film Festival, Turkey
Winner of the award for Best Original Score
2015 Davis International Film Festival, USA
Winner of the award for Best Animation
PreFoto International Photography Competition 2011
Winner of the 1st prize 
Fokus International Competition of Artistic Photography 2011
Winner of the 3rd prize
WPGA Annual Pollux Awards 2010
Emerging Talent of the Year
Pilsner Urquell International Photography Awards 2009
3rd place – Editorial – Personality
3rd place – Fine Art – Collage
PX3 Prix de la Photographie Paris 2009
First Prize – Advertising – Music
Third Prize – Fine Art – Digitally Enhanced
Trierenberg Super Circuit 2009
Goldmedal – Painted With Light – Special Themes
Pilsner Urquell International Photography Awards 2008
1st place – Editorial – Personality
1st place – Advertising – Music
3rd place – Advertising – Other
3rd place – Special – Digitally Enhanced

Exhibitions 

2018 – "FILE 2018 – Electronic Language International Festival", Fiesp Cultural Center, São Paulo, Brazil
2017 – "Celebration of the Arts – Art in Motion", Fort Worth, Texas, United States
2014 – "Colors of Life – Young Men with Big Dreams", Pepco Edison Gallery, Washington DC, United States
2012 – "6th Arte Laguna Prize Finalist Artists Exhibition", Palazzo Correr, Romanian Cultural Institute, Venice, Italy
2012 'Worldwide Photography Biennial Exhibition', The Borges Cultural Center, Buenos Aires, Argentina
2011 'PreFoto', Cultural Center "Abdullah Krashnica", Preševo, Serbia
2011 'Exposition Focus', Gallery of Art, Fier, Albania
2011 'Colors of Life', Art Works, Richmond, Virginia
2011 'Colors of Life', Capital One Corporate Gallery, Richmond, Virginia
2010 'Colors of Life', Embassy of Guatemala, Washington DC
2008 'IPA Best of Show', Soho Gallery, New York

References

External links 

Turkish film directors
Turkish photographers
Digital artists
1989 births
Living people
Turkish composers
People from Prague